Thou Shalt Not may refer to:

 "Thou shalt not", the initial phrase used in the King James Version of the Bible for most of the Ten Commandments
 ThouShaltNot, a former music band
 Thou Shalt Not (musical), a Broadway musical based on the novel Thérèse Raquin by Émile Zola
 "Thou Shalt Not...", a television series episode from Quantum Leap
 Thou Shalt Not (1919 film), a 1919 American drama film directed by Charles Brabin.
 Thou Shalt Not (album)
 "Thou Shalt Not", 1940 photograph by Adolph L. "Whitey" Schafer.

Hebrew Bible words and phrases